For a complete list see :Category:Football clubs in the Central African Republic

A
Anges de Fatima
Asset Gobongo
Association Sportive des Commerçants
AS Kpéténé Star
AS Tempête Mocaf

C
Castel Foot

D
Diplomates Football Club du 8ème Arrondissement

E
Espérance FC du 5ème Arrondissement

O
Olympic Real de Bangui

S
SCAF Tocages
Sporting Club de Bangui
Stade Centrafricain

U
TP USCA Bangui

 
Central African Republic
Central African Republic sport-related lists
Football clubs